Åke Esbjörn Ericson (16 May 1913 – 16 November 1986) was a Swedish ice hockey player. He competed in the men's tournaments at the 1936 Winter Olympics and the 1948 Winter Olympics.

References

External links
 

1913 births
1986 deaths
Ice hockey players at the 1936 Winter Olympics
Ice hockey players at the 1948 Winter Olympics
Olympic ice hockey players of Sweden
Ice hockey people from Stockholm